Santiago Herrero (9 May 1943 – 10 June 1970) was a Spanish professional Grand Prix motorcycle road racer. He was Spain's most promising international motorcycle racer until he died from injuries sustained while competing in the Isle of Man TT.

Biography
Born in Madrid, Spain, Herrero bought his first motorcycle at the age of 12. In 1962, he obtained his racing license, competing on a Derbi and doing his own maintenance. He soon moved up to a Bultaco Tralla 125 and caught the eye of Luis Bejarano, the owner of Lube (a Spanish motorcycle marque) who recognized Herrero's talent. Bejarano offered him a job in the company's competition department. In 1964, Herrero finished in third place in the 125cc Spanish National Championship and in 1965, he finished in second. Unfortunately for Lube, the marque ran into financial difficulties and went out of business.

Herrero decided to go into business for himself, running a motorcycle repair shop in Bilbao. He purchased a Bultaco and competed as a privateer. Around this period, Eduardo Giró, lead designer of the Ossa motorcycle company developed a revolutionary bike with a monocoque chassis. Recognizing Herrero's riding talent as well as his mechanical skills, Giró offered him a job to develop the Ossa 250cc race bike. The Ossa's monocoque chassis' superior stiffness and weight imbued it with exceptional cornering and braking abilities which, in turn allowed for faster cornering speeds than the competition. Together they won the 250cc Spanish National Championship in 1967.

Grand Prix championship
In 1968, he would move up to compete in the 250cc Grand Prix world championship. Although the single cylinder Ossa had 20 horsepower (15 kW) less than the powerful V4 Yamahas of Phil Read and Bill Ivy, the Ossa was 45 pounds (20 kg) lighter and its monocoque frame was much stiffer, giving it superior agility. Herrero was able to take advantage of the Ossa's light weight and superior handling characteristics to remain competitive, especially on tighter race tracks. The Yamahas swept the championship, but Herrero left no doubt that the little Ossa was quick and dependable. He finished seventh in the championship and claimed a third place in the final race of the season at Monza. He would once again take the 250cc Spanish National Championship.

In 1969, the FIM changed its regulations in an effort to reduce spiraling costs in motorcycle racing. 125cc and 250cc machines would be limited to two cylinders and 6-speed transmissions. This regulation change caused the dominant Yamaha and Suzuki factories to withdraw their teams from Grand Prix racing.

The 1969 Grand Prix season would be even more successful for Herrero. He began the year winning his first grand prix at the opening race of the season in front of his countrymen at Jarama. After retiring from the German Grand Prix with mechanical problems, he returned with a victory at Le Mans. He followed this with third place at the Isle of Man TT, a considerable accomplishment considering his horsepower deficit on the infamous Snaefell Mountain Course. He triumphed again at Spa and was leading the championship points race when he was beset by bad luck. He crashed in the rain at the Ulster Grand Prix and suffered a broken left arm. Most observers considered his championship hopes dashed, but Herrero showed true grit by coming back to finish in a remarkable fifth place at Imola. At last race of the season in Yugoslavia, he held a one-point lead in the championship. He started the race in the lead but crashed on the seventh lap, ending his championship hopes. He would finish third in the world championship. He repeated as Spanish 250cc champion for a third consecutive year.

Herrero got the 1970 season off to a promising start. Although, he retired from the first race of the season in Germany, he finished in second in the French Grand Prix and took a victory in Yugoslavia. The grand prix circuit then moved to the treacherous Isle of Man venue for the 1970 Isle of Man TT. Herrero crashed at the 13th milestone (Westwood Corner), losing control of his motorcycle on melted tar during the sixth and final lap of the 250cc Lightweight TT. Despite a previous setback at Braddan Bridge when he went up the slip road and crashed, breaking his windscreen, he had battled back up to third place. Stan Woods, who had originally been reported to have collided with Herrero, actually crashed while trying to avoid him. As a result of the accident, Woods suffered a broken ankle and two broken collar-bones. Herrero died of irreversible shock and from his injuries two days later. He was 27 years old. The cause of the accident, described by Stanley Woods, "may have been melting tar on the bend." His loss affected the Ossa factory so much that they abandoned racing altogether. Spain had lost one of its first racing heroes.

Motorcycle Grand Prix results

(key) (Races in bold indicate pole position; races in italics indicate fastest lap)

Sources

1943 births
1970 deaths
Spanish motorcycle racers
Motorcycle racers who died while racing
250cc World Championship riders
50cc World Championship riders
Isle of Man TT riders
Sportspeople from Madrid
Sport deaths in the Isle of Man